James Kalaeone Clark  (July 28, 1929 – July 30, 2000) wan an American football guard in the National Football League for the Washington Redskins.  He played college football at Oregon State University and was drafted in the fifth round of the 1952 NFL Draft.

After his football career, Clark was elected to the Hawaii House of Representatives in 1962 as a Republican and served there until 1966, when he won his first term in the Hawaii Senate; in 1969 he switched to the Democratic Party.  His father-in-law was the former Honolulu Mayor Neal Blaisdell.

External links
Obit

1929 births
2000 deaths
American football offensive guards
American football offensive tackles
Hawaii state senators
Members of the Hawaii House of Representatives
Oregon State Beavers football players
Washington Redskins players
Hawaii Republicans
Hawaii Democrats
20th-century American politicians
American athlete-politicians
Players of American football from Honolulu